Calvin Michael Mosley, Jr. (born August 6, 1983) is a former American football defensive tackle.  He was drafted by the Minnesota Vikings in the sixth round of the 2005 NFL Draft. He played college football at Missouri. He has also played for the Cleveland Browns, New York Jets, Jacksonville Jaguars, Detroit Lions and Miami Dolphins.

Early years
Mosley was born in Fort Knox, Kentucky, and earned All-State honors at Waynesville High School in Waynesville, Missouri and was ranked among the top defensive tackle prospects by Rivals.com. He was a three-time All-District selection posted 21.0 sacks and 267 tackles during his career, and recorded 97 tackles and 10 sacks as a senior. He also finished 3rd in the shot put at the Missouri state track meet as a senior.

College career
After being redshirted at the University of Missouri in 2001, he earned Freshman All-America honorable mention honors from College Football News in 2002. He played in every game with 5 starts at nose guard and posted 39 tackles, 3 sacks, 8 tackles for loss, and a forced fumble. He began his collegiate career with 3 tackles, and 2 tackles for loss at Illinois and had 8 tackles and added a sack and 2 tackles for loss vs. Colorado. He also recorded a season-high 9 tackles and made a sack and 3 tackles for loss at Texas A&M.

In 2003, he earned 2nd-team All-Big 12 honors from the league's coaches and was named the team's Defensive Lineman of the Year. That season, he started 11 games at nose guard and ranked among the nation's leaders with 16 tackles for loss on the year. He also was 2nd on the team with 7 QB hurries and 6.0 sacks. He registered 7 tackles, 4 tackles for loss, and 2.0 sacks in season opener vs. Illinois, and had 3 tackles and a sack vs. Eastern Illinois. He came off the bench to record 8 tackles, a sack that knocked QB Bill Whittmore out of the game, and added 2 tackles for loss at Kansas. Against Texas A&M, he made 9 tackles and also had 2 sacks and 3 tackles for loss. In the Independence Bowl vs. Arkansas, he registered 4 tackles and a tackle for loss.

In 2004, Mosley earned Associated Press 1st-team All-Big 12 honors and was named the team's Defensive Lineman of the Year. That year, he started all 11 games at RDT, and led a defense that finished 2nd in the conference and 14th nationally in total yardage allowed. He made 61 tackles, 6.5 sacks, 14 tackles for loss, as well as recovering 2 fumbles, forced another, and blocked a kick. He opened the season with 8 tackles, 3 QB hurries, a sack, and 3 tackles for loss vs. Arkansas State. The following week at Troy, he posted 8 tackles, 2.0 sacks, and 3 tackles for loss. Versus Colorado, he recorded 5 tackles, a sack, and 3 tackles for loss. He registered 8 tackles and a fumble recovery at Texas, and had 5 tackles, a sack, and a forced fumble vs. Oklahoma State. He blocked a kick and added a fumble recovery and 4 tackles vs. Kansas State. C.J. finished his career with 4 tackles and a sack at Iowa State.

Mosley started 27 of 36 games he played in during his 3 years with the Tigers. He recorded 167 tackles with 15.5 sacks, 38 tackles for loss, and 22 QB hurries. He was part of a defense in 2004 that ranked 2nd in the Big 12 and 14th nationally in total yardage allowed and was twice named the team's Defensive Lineman of the Year.

Professional career

Minnesota Vikings
In his rookie year for Minnesota, Mosley accumulated 19 tackles, 3 sacks and 1 forced fumble while filling in for an injured Kevin Williams in the middle of the 2005 NFL season.

New York Jets
Mosley, along with an undisclosed draft pick, was traded to the Jets on August 31, 2006 for backup quarterback Brooks Bollinger.

Cleveland Browns
Mosley signed a two-year, $5 million with the Cleveland Browns on March 6, 2009. He became the first former Jets player in NFL history to later join the Browns in his career.

Mosley was placed on injured reserve on December 7, 2009, due to a broken right ankle.

Jacksonville Jaguars
Mosley was signed by the Jacksonville Jaguars on October 5, 2010. The Jaguars re-signed him on March 15, 2012.

He was released on April 1, 2013.

Detroit Lions
On April 3, 2013 Mosley signed with the Detroit Lions on a two-year contract.

The Lions sent Mosley home early before their game in London against the Atlanta Falcons after they discovered marijuana in his hotel room.

Miami Dolphins
On June 10, 2015, Mosley signed a one-year contract with the Miami Dolphins, reuniting him with former Detroit teammate, Ndamukong Suh. On December 1, 2015, he was waived/injured, but was placed on the team's injured reserve the following day after clearing waivers.

On December 18, 2015, Mosley was waived by the Miami Dolphins.

References

External links

Detroit Lions bio
Jacksonville Jaguars bio
Missouri Tigers bio

1983 births
Living people
Players of American football from Kentucky
People from Waynesville, Missouri
African-American players of American football
American football defensive tackles
American football defensive ends
Missouri Tigers football players
Minnesota Vikings players
New York Jets players
Cleveland Browns players
Jacksonville Jaguars players
Detroit Lions players
Miami Dolphins players
21st-century African-American sportspeople
20th-century African-American people